Angus Cameron Seed MM (6 February 1893 – 7 February 1953) was an English professional footballer, best remembered for his 16 years as manager of Barnsley in the Football League. He had a long playing career as a right back in non-League football and after retiring, he was Aldershot's first-ever manager and worked as a scout for Charlton Athletic.

Personal life 
Seed's younger brother Jimmy was also a professional footballer, who played for Tottenham Hotspur, Sheffield Wednesday and England. Angus Seed served in the 2nd and 17th Battalions of the Middlesex Regiment during the First World War. On the night of 1–2 June 1916, he won the Military Medal for his actions as a stretcher bearer on Vimy Ridge, dragging wounded men back to the British dugouts under heavy fire. One of the men Seed dragged back, former Arsenal assistant trainer Tom Ratcliff, later became Seed's trainer at Barnsley. Later in June 1916, Seed received a shrapnel wound in the right hip, which eventually caused him to retire from football. He died of chronic bronchitis at Kendray Hospital in Barnsley on 7 February 1953.

Honours 
Aldershot
 Southern League Eastern Division: 1929–30
Barnsley
 Football League Third Division North: 1938–39

Career statistics

References

External links 

 

1893 births
People from Lanchester, County Durham
Footballers from County Durham
1953 deaths
English footballers
Association football fullbacks
Whitburn F.C. players
South Shields F.C. (1889) players
Seaham Harbour F.C. players
Everton F.C. players
Leicester City F.C. players
Reading F.C. players
St Bernard's F.C. players
Mid Rhondda F.C. players
Ebbw Vale F.C. players
Broxburn United F.C. players
Workington A.F.C. players
English Football League players
Scottish Football League players
Southern Football League players
English football managers
Aldershot F.C. managers
Barnsley F.C. managers
Southern Football League managers
Charlton Athletic F.C. non-playing staff
British Army personnel of World War I
Middlesex Regiment soldiers
Recipients of the Military Medal
Deaths from bronchitis
Workington A.F.C. managers
People from Whitburn, Tyne and Wear
Footballers from Tyne and Wear
Association football scouts